Marble Caves is a cave in Crimea, at the lower plateau of Chatyr-Dag, mountainous massif. It is a popular tourist attraction being one of the most visited caves in Europe.

Due to its uniqueness, the Marble Cave became famous worldwide. Speleologists consider it among the top five most beautiful caves of the planet, and one of the Seven Natural Wonders of Ukraine. In 1992, it was included in the International Association of equipped caves.

History 
In 1987, the Simferopol speleology team discovered a cave with a complex system of halls and galleries between Bin Bash-Koba (Thousand Heads) and Suuk-Koba (Cold). In 1988, the center of speleology tourism Onyx-tour established sightseeing tours, concrete paths were laid, and lighting.

The tour goes through the Fairy Tales gallery, Tiger Path, with hundreds of various stalactites, the Reconstruction Room, the largest cave room of the Crimea and one of the largest equipped rooms in Europe with its length of 100 metres and height of 28 metres, the Pink Room, with stone roses covering the top of the room, the Palace Hall, with "Queen" and "King" columns, and the Hope and Balcony Room. A stalactite "forest" leads to the Luster Room. Dozens of precious "chandeliers" hang down from the ceiling covered with coralite "flowers", some of them almost reach the floor. Here is the place where the tour ends, yet the cave has four more rooms: Landslide, Channel, Chocolate, and Geliktite.

See also 
 Chatyr-Dag

References

External links 
 
 Pictures of the Marble Caves with route description 

Landforms of Crimea
Tourist attractions in Crimea
Show caves
Caves of Russia